Dennis Edward Greenhouse is an American politician who served as the Delaware Auditor of Accounts from 1983 to 1989, and again in 2022 to 2023. He has also served as the New Castle County Executive from 1989 to 1996. Greenhouse is a member of the Democratic Party.

Career
Greenhouse, a Democrat, was first elected as the Delaware Auditor of Accounts in 1982, narrowly defeating Republican Thomas W. Spruance. He was re-elected in 1986, defeating future Auditor Tom Wagner.

Greenhouse resigned his position as Auditor in 1989 to become the New Castle County Executive, after winning election to that position in 1988. He was re-elected to his position as New Castle County Executive uncontested in 1992.

Greenhouse was re-appointed as the Delaware Auditor of Accounts in 2022 by Delaware governor John Carney, following the resignation of Democratic incumbent Kathy McGuiness. He did not run for re-election to a full term in 2022, and was succeeded by Democrat Lydia York. Greenhouse served on York's transition team as she took over the office.

Electoral history

References

External links

|-

1950 births
20th-century American politicians
21st-century American politicians
Delaware Democrats
Delaware State Auditors
Living people
New Castle County Executives